Binauli  is a small town in Baghpat district in Uttar Pradesh, India. Binauli is between Baraut and Barnava on Meerut road. Binauli is a religious Village, with many Hindu Jain's temples. It is under in NCR PLAN. It has one block, with one Police Station, Government Hospital, and a post office. Binauli is about 13 km from Baraut, 42 km from Meerut and 70 km from Delhi.

Climate 
The climate of Binauli is warm and cool.

Economy
Binauli is laced with such facilities as a market, petrol pump, Thana (Police Station), Banks, pani ki tanki (Water Tank) etc. The villagers from the neighboring villages throng its market for buying daily necessities.
There are total 4 main Government banks:
 State Bank of India (SBI)
 Punjab National Bank (PNB)
 Canara Bank

Education 
There is one Government senior secondary school (Sarva Hitkari Inter College Binauli, Baghpat). This school has a great importance for all the people of Binauli, SirsalGarh, GarahiDulla, ShaikPura, and other neighbour village of Binauli. Apart from this there are many other private schools. There is two prathmik vidyalaya.

Occupation
Occupation of the people of Binauli is mostly Agriculture. Approximately 70% people are dependent upon agriculture. Main crops of Binauli are sugarcane, wheat and rice. Also vegetables like Gourds, Pumpkins, Potatoes, Ladyfinger, Spinach, Radish and Carrots are also grown.

Infrastructure

There is a Government Hospital, and a police station, police chowki, sports ground, and post office. it is a BLOCK city, near about 70 village under this block.

References

  Census 2011
 SBI IFSC code
 Sarva Hitkari Inter College

Villages in Bagpat district